Untouchables is the fifth studio album by American nu metal band Korn. The album was officially released on June 11, 2002 and featured the Grammy-winning single "Here to Stay". Untouchables debuted at number two on the Billboard 200 with 495,991 copies sold during its first week, second only to Eminem's The Eminem Show. The album received positive reviews from music critics. It was certified platinum on July 11, 2002, and has sold at least 1.4 million copies in the United States.

Conception
Korn commenced writing Untouchables in early 2001. Tension between band members grew and, in an effort to lessen their tensions and distractions, they continued writing in Scottsdale, Arizona, in hope that the new landscape would inspire them in writing songs. They finished writing the album then went back to Los Angeles, California to begin recording. Hostility between band members was still there. During the tour, band members began to consider firing bassist Reginald "Fieldy" Arvizu due to his drug abuse problem, but decided against it.

Untouchables was recorded at Conway Studio, in Hollywood, California and The Village, in Los Angeles, California. The album was produced by Michael Beinhorn and recorded by Frank Filipetti. The album featured the same member line-up as their previous four studio albums. It is the first album recorded in 96 kHz digital sound. It was mixed by Andy Wallace and mastered by Howie Weinberg. On the album's release date, June 11, 2002, a single, "Here to Stay" was released by Sony Music Distribution. The album was re-released on November 12, 2002, as a last-ditch effort to rejuvenate album sales, which had fallen shortly after the album's first week on the Billboard 200. This limited edition features different artwork, and a bonus DVD, containing a live version of "Here to Stay", performance versions of the "Here to Stay" and "Thoughtless" music videos, and a live recording of "Got the Life".

The band has revealed that the total recording costs of Untouchables were estimated at $3,000,000 due to recording/living expenses and keeping their 15-person crew on retainer for the nearly two years it took to finish the album. As part of the total cost were included five houses rented for $10,000 apiece for four months, when they moved to Phoenix. When they came to Los Angeles, they rented five houses for $10,000 apiece for four more months; and a house rented for $8,000 a week, when they went to Canada. Jonathan Davis commented in an interview with Noisey:

"We were coming off of Issues, and we wanted to make an amazing record. That's when we hooked up with Michael Beinhorn, and Beinhorn's whole vision was to make an amazing sounding rock record that could never be made again. [...] I wanted to shoot a documentary about that record. We spent so much money, the drums alone we spent a whole month just getting drum sounds. There were 50 mics just on the drumset that they picked out and tested. [...] Usually I do my vocals and it takes me a month or two weeks, but just vocals it took me five, almost six months. With Beinhorn, sometimes I'd walk in and sing and he'd just say, "Go home, your voice ain't right." [...] It was the peak and pinnacle of everything in Korn. I still can't believe how much work went in on it. It was a lot."

Reception

Untouchables sold over 434,000 copies in its first week, but did not surpass the sales from The Eminem Show by Eminem and came at number two on Billboard. Davis blamed Internet piracy for the drop in sales compared to previous albums, since the album had leaked onto file-sharing websites with a different track order and song titles more than two months prior to its official release date.

Untouchables received mostly positive reviews from music critics. At Metacritic, the album received a score of 80/100 based on 11 critics, indicating "generally favorable reviews". It remained their most critically acclaimed album for 17 years until the release of their 2019 album, The Nothing, which currently sits at an 83/100.

Track listing
All songs written by Korn.

 "Here to Stay (T-Ray's Mix)" is a hidden track on the limited edition, beginning at 5:06 after "No One's There". On some standard edition pressings, it is its own separate hidden track, without the silence. 
 "Beat It Upright" was not included on the edited version of the album.

Bonus DVD
 "Here to Stay (Live at Hammerstein)"
 "Here to Stay (Performance Version)"
 "Thoughtless (Performance Version)"
 "Got the Life (Live at Hammerstein)"

Charts

Weekly charts

Year-end charts

Singles

Certifications

Personnel

Korn
Jonathan Davis – vocals
Munky – rhythm and lead guitars
Head – lead and rhythm guitars
Fieldy – bass
David Silveria – drums

Production and other credits
Michael Beinhorn – producer
Andy Wallace – mixing
Howie Weinberg – mastering

Notes

References

2002 albums
Albums produced by Michael Beinhorn
Epic Records albums
Korn albums
Immortal Records albums